Alkara is a small village in the Barnala district in the state of Punjab, India. Nearest town is Bhadaur at a distance of 3 Km.

History 
Alkara is a relatively  younger village, it is around 200 years old.

Geography 
It has an average elevation of 219 metres (718 feet). It is at a distance of 4 km from nearest town Bhadaur.

Demographics 

As of the 2011 Census of India, Alkara had a population of 2019. Males constitute 53% of the population and females 47%. Alkara has an average literacy rate of 57%, with 56% of the males and 44% of females literate.  10% of the population is under 6 years of age.

References 

Cities and towns in Barnala district
Sangrur